Southridge High School is a public high school in Beaverton, Oregon, United States. The school currently offers the International Baccalaureate program, and some Advanced Placement courses. Southridge was one of the projects paid for by the $146 million bond approved in 1996. The school opened to 9-11th grades in 1999 with an initial enrollment of 1,236, grade 12 was added the following year. Sarah Boly was the school's first principal.

Athletics

State championships
 Baseball: 2002
 Softball: 2005
 Women's basketball: 2005, 2006, 2007, 2008, 2010, 2017, 2018
 Football: 2008
 Women's track and field: 2009
 Men's water polo: 2011  2012  2013
 Dance team: 2015
 Volleyball: 2017

Notable alumni
 Darwin Barney, baseball player
 Chad Barrett, soccer player
 Jace Fry, baseball player
 Jeron Mastrud, NFL tight end
 Behdad Sami, basketball player

References

External links
 Southridge High School website

High schools in Washington County, Oregon
Education in Beaverton, Oregon
International Baccalaureate schools in Oregon
Educational institutions established in 1999
Buildings and structures in Beaverton, Oregon
Public high schools in Oregon
1999 establishments in Oregon
Beaverton School District